The Wianamatta Group is a geological feature of the Sydney Basin, New South Wales, Australia that directly overlies the older (but still Triassic in age) Hawkesbury sandstone and generally comprise fine grained sedimentary rocks such as shales and laminites as well as less common sandstone units.

Group
The Wianamatta Group is made up of the following units (listed in stratigraphic order):
 Bringelly Shale
 Minchinbury Sandstone
 Ashfield Shale

The Wianamatta Group was derived from the Aboriginal name for South Creek. It was officially established in 1952, fully attested in 1954 and further amended in 1979.

Geology

The Wianamatta Group is the youngest geological layer member of the Sydney Basin, and therefore lies at the highest point as the highest layer member. It was deposited in connection with a large river delta, which shifted over time from west to east. This is evidenced by the sequence of strata, which clearly show the transition from marine deposits in front of the delta to deposits on land: Ashfield shale was formed from clayey marine sediments. The subsequent Minchinbury Sandstone emerged from beach - Nehrungs Islands. The Bringelly shale became alluvial in a marshy plain deposited on the delta, meandered through the rivers, and deposited sand at various locations, each of which was narrowly defined, which later solidified into sandstone.

Weathering 
Today's weathering of the surface of the existing claystone produces abundant clay, which leads to the formation of clay soils with low water permeability, as they occur, for example, on the Cumberland Plain widespread. Here are Podsol floors widespread that swell when supplying water and shrink during drying.

Over the pitches of the Wianamatta Group, water-bearing layers can form. Deep and large clay deposits of this formation are able to collect groundwater; however, if they are at or near the surface, salted dry land may form as the water evaporates. The quality of the groundwater over the pitches can be good, so that drinkable water occurs, or it can be very saline and thus not potable. The lower groundwater resources in the Wianamatta Group rocks are generally less saline than the near-surface occurrences.

Depositional environment
The Wianamatta Group has been inferred to represent a cycle of basin infilling associated with the migration of a large delta front from west to east. The Ashfield Shale was deposited in a low energy marine environment and preserves laminated silty sediments. The Minchinbury Sandstone comprises a set of sandy barrier islands at the former shoreline. The Bringelly Shale was deposited in a swampy alluvial plain with meandering streams flowing from the west forming discontinuous beds of sandstone.

Weathering
Weathering of the shale units produces a rich clayey soil, often with poor drainage, such as that in the Cumberland Plain. These clay soils are recognised as being reactive with appreciable Shrink-swell capacity.

Low-lying areas where groundwater is close to the surface are also susceptible to dryland salinity. Groundwater quality can range from fresh to highly saline, with the deeper groundwater generally less saline.

Other rock types found in the Sydney Basin include the Narrabeen shale, Mittagong formation, Illawarra Coal Measures, Newcastle Coal Measures, and Shoalhaven Group.

References

Geology of New South Wales